Perepelkin is a lunar impact crater that is located just to the south of the similar crater Love. It was named after Soviet astrophysicist Yevgeny Perepyolkin. Attached to the exterior of its southern rim is the smaller Shirakatsi. Less than one crater diameter to the east-northeast is Lane, and to the west-southwest are the co-joined Danjon and D'Arsonval.

The rim of this crater is relatively heavily eroded, and is similar in appearance to Love to the north. Along the western inner wall is an odd, pear-shaped crater that is probably a merge of two impacts. There is a short chain of small craterlets along the southwestern inner wall. The floor is pitted by tiny impacts, but is relatively level compared to the surrounding terrain. There is a small central peak at the midpoint that has a ridge extension to the southeast.

Satellite craters
By convention these features are identified on lunar maps by placing the letter on the side of the crater midpoint that is closest to Perepelkin.

References

External links

Perepelkin at The Moon Wiki
Digital Lunar Orbiter Photo Number I-136-H2

Impact craters on the Moon